Santeri Airola (born 29 June 2000) is a Finnish professional ice hockey defenceman. He is currently playing for KOOVEE in the Mestis while under contract with Ilves of the Liiga. Airola was drafted 211th overall by the Pittsburgh Penguins in the 2019 NHL Entry Draft.

Playing career
Airola played as a youth within the SaiPa organization before moving to hometown Mestis club, Imatran Ketterä. He made his Liiga debut on loan with SaiPa on 29 December 2018 against Ilves. He went onto to play three games for SaiPa during the 2018–19 Liiga season.

On 24 March 2020, Airola left Ketterä agreeing to an optional three-year contract with Liiga club Ilves.

Career statistics

References

External links

2000 births
Living people
Finnish ice hockey defencemen
Ilves players
People from Imatra
Imatran Ketterä players
KOOVEE players
Pittsburgh Penguins draft picks
SaiPa players
Sportspeople from South Karelia
21st-century Finnish people